Mount Shakspere is a 12,174-foot-elevation (3,711 meter) summit located in Fresno County, California, United States.

Description
The mountain is set four miles west of the crest of the Sierra Nevada mountain range, in the Palisades area of Kings Canyon National Park. The first ascent of the summit was made July 20, 1930, by Francis P. Farquhar, Mary Lou Michaels, Doris Drust, Lorna Kilgariff, and Robert L. Lipman. This mountain's name has been officially adopted by the United States Board on Geographic Names.

Climate
Mount Shakspere is located in an alpine climate zone. Most weather fronts originate in the Pacific Ocean, and travel east toward the Sierra Nevada mountains. As fronts approach, they are forced upward by the peaks (orographic lift), causing them to drop their moisture in the form of rain or snowfall onto the range. Precipitation runoff from this mountain drains into tributaries of the Middle Fork Kings River.

Gallery

See also

 Sequoia-Kings Canyon Wilderness

References

External links
 Weather forecast: Mount Shakspere

Mountains of Fresno County, California
Mountains of Kings Canyon National Park
North American 3000 m summits
Mountains of Northern California
Sierra Nevada (United States)